This is a list of child actors from China. Films and/or television series they appeared in are mentioned only if they were still a child at the time of filming.

Current child actors (under the age of eighteen) are indicated by boldface.

C 
Bill Chan (born 1950)
Paul Chun (born 1945)

I 
Gouw Ian Iskandar (born 1997)

L 
Bruce Lee (1940-1973)
Prudence Liew (born 1964)
Petrina Fung (born 1954)

S 
Lydia Shum (1945-2008)

W 
Wen Junhui (born 1996)

List
China
Child